Sidriyat Makin is a settlement in Qatar, located in the municipality of Ash Shamal, about 100 kilometers north of Doha.

Etymology
The 'Sidriyat' portion of the settlement's name refers to the sidra trees which grow in the area. 'Makin' is the name of a nearby settlement which it was named after.

References

Populated places in Al Shamal